Robert Harry Doherty Rogers,  & Bar (7 November 1921 – 3 June 2000) was a Chief of the South African Air Force. He joined the South African Air Force (SAAF) in 1940, and served in the Second World War and the Korean War. He subsequently rose through the ranks to become Chief of the SAAF. After his military career he entered politics and served as a Member of Parliament.

Early life and education
Rogers was born in Warden in the Orange Free State, South Africa, on 7 November 1921. He won his Springbok (i.e. national) colours for shooting, and later joined the South African Air Force (SAAF), commencing his flying training in January 1941. 
He matriculated from Maritzburg College in 1938, upon which he enrolled as a medical student at the University of the Witwatersrand until mid-1940, before joining the SAAF as a volunteer for active service in World War II, first qualifying as an air gunner. When he volunteered to train as a pilot, he went to Southern Rhodesia for training.

Career
By October 1941, Rogers was assigned to No. 208 Squadron RAF in Egypt, where he flew Hurricanes and Spitfires in North Africa, Sicily, Italy and Austria. He was shot down near Benghazi in 1942, but managed to escape capture. In August 1942, despite having a finger shot off, he fought off four Luftwaffe ME 109s. By December 1943, he had been promoted to lieutenant colonel and placed in command of No. 225 Squadron RAF. For his services he was awarded the Distinguished Service Order and the Distinguished Flying Cross and Bar. Even his father, who was a captain in the army, had to salute him – much to the delight of both men. Towards the end of World War II, Rogers was put in charge of his old squadron, 40 Squadron SAAF.

After the war, Rogers accepted a permanent commission in the SAAF with the rank of captain, and served in various posts, including as a flight instructor and as Aide-de-Camp to the Governor-General of the Union. Rogers served in the Korean War in 1951 and 1953 as a fighter bomber pilot, flying Mustangs and Sabres. He earned the American Distinguished Flying Cross, Air Medal with oak leaf cluster, and the Korean Order of Military Merit. In 1954, he married Clare Bosch and they had a son.

Rogers went on to hold various command and staff posts, including officer commanding 12 Squadron SAAF and 24 Squadron SAAF and, at the end of 1974, he was appointed Acting Chief of the Air Force. He was promoted lieutenant general in March 1975 when he was confirmed as Chief of the Air Force, the post he held until his retirement in 1979.

Retirement
Rogers retired from the SAAF in 1979 and settled in Knysna, Cape Province. In 1989, he became the Democratic Party MP for Walmer, Port Elizabeth and was defence spokesman for that party in parliament.

Honours and awards

Rogers was awarded the Distinguished Service Order and Distinguished Flying Cross and Bar for his gallantry in combat operations, as well as being Mentioned in Despatches, during the Second World War. In Korea, he was awarded the American Distinguished Flying Cross, the Air Medal with oak leaf cluster and the South Korean Chungmu Decoration with Gold Star. For service in the SAAF, he was awarded the Order of the Star of South Africa, the Southern Cross Medal and the Chief of Defence Force Commendation (now known as the Medal of Military Merit).

List
 
 
 
  Korea Medal
 
 
 
 
 
 
 
 
 
 
 
 
 
 
  Order of Military Merit (Korea) (Chungmu cordon) with Gold Star
  United Nations Service Medal for Korea 
  Korean War Service Medal
  Grand Star of Military Merit (Chile)
  Presidential Unit Citation (US)

See also

List of South African military chiefs
South African Air Force

References

1921 births
2000 deaths
White South African people
South African military personnel of the Korean War
Companions of the Distinguished Service Order
Recipients of the Distinguished Flying Cross (United Kingdom)
Alumni of Maritzburg College
Recipients of the Distinguished Flying Cross (United States)
Recipients of the Air Medal
Recipients of the Order of Military Merit (Korea)
South African World War II pilots
Chiefs of the South African Air Force